Fiano may refer to:

Places:
 Fiano, Piedmont, a town in Piedmont, Italy
 Fiano Romano, a town in Lazio, Italy

Viticulture:
 Fiano (grape), a white grape variety from Campania, Italy
 Fiano di Avellino, an Italian wine DOCG

See also 

 Foiano (disambiguation)